Jalaj (Devanagari: जलज) is an Indian masculine given name that originates from Sanskrit language. The Sanskrit word  (a compound of  'water' and  'born') means 'produced or born or living or growing in water, coming from or peculiar to water' and can refer, among other things, to the lotus.. Other given names with the same meaning are Pankaj, Neeraj and Saroj.

Notable people
 Jai Kumar Jalaj (born 1932), prominent figure in Hindi Literature.
 Jalaj Saxena (born 1986), Indian cricketer.

References

Indian masculine given names
Sanskrit-language names